Butebi is a village in Mityana District, in the Central Region of Uganda.

Location
Butebi is located in Nakibanga Parish, Busimbi sub-county, Ssingo County, in Mityana District. The geographical coordinates of the village are 0°20'44.0"N, 32°00'04.0"E (Latitude:0.345556; Longitude:32.001111).

Overview
Butebi lies close to the north-eastern shores of Lake Wamala.

Notable people
Butebi is the birth place of Francis Zaake, the member of parliament representing Mityana Municipality, in the 10th Ugandan parliament (2016–2021).

DJ Erycom is also born in Butebi Nakibanga village.

References

External links
Website of Mityana District Local Government

Populated places in Central Region, Uganda
Cities in the Great Rift Valley
Mityana District